I, Claudius (stylized as I·CLAVDIVS) is a 1976 BBC Television adaptation of Robert Graves' 1934 novel I, Claudius and its 1935 sequel Claudius the God. Written by Jack Pulman, it stars Derek Jacobi as Claudius, with Siân Phillips, Brian Blessed, George Baker, Margaret Tyzack, John Hurt, Patricia Quinn, Ian Ogilvy, Kevin McNally, Patrick Stewart, and John Rhys-Davies. The series covers the history of the early Roman Empire, told from the perspective of the elderly Emperor Claudius who narrates the series.

Among many other productions and adaptations, Graves' Claudius novels have also been adapted for BBC Radio 4 broadcast (2010) and for the stage (1972).

Plot summary and episodes

I, Claudius follows the history of the early Roman Empire, narrated by the elderly Roman Emperor Claudius, from the year 24 BC to his death in AD 54.

The series opens with Augustus, the first Emperor of Rome, attempting to find an heir, and his wife, Livia, plotting to elevate her own son Tiberius to this position. An expert poisoner, Livia uses the covert assassination and betrayal of all rivals to achieve her aims, beginning with the death in 22 BC of Marcellus. The plotting, double-crossing, and murder continue for many decades, through the reign of Tiberius, the political conspiracy of his Praetorian Prefect Sejanus, and the depraved rule of the lunatic emperor Caligula, culminating in the accidental rise to power of his uncle Claudius. Claudius' enlightened reign is marred by the betrayals of his adulterous wife Messalina and his boyhood friend Herod Agrippa. Eventually, Claudius comes to accept the inevitability of his own assassination and consents to marrying his scheming niece, Agrippina the Younger, clearing the way for the ascent of his mad stepson, Nero, whose disastrous reign Claudius vainly hopes will bring about the restoration of the Roman Republic.

Cast

 Derek Jacobi as Claudius
 Ashley Knight as Young Claudius
 Siân Phillips as Livia
 George Baker as Tiberius
 John Hurt as Caligula
 Robert Morgan as Young Caligula 
 Brian Blessed as Augustus
 Patrick Stewart as Sejanus
 Margaret Tyzack as Antonia
 Amanda Kirby as Young Antonia
 Patricia Quinn as Livilla
 Katharine Levy as Young Livilla
 John Paul as Agrippa
 Sheila White as Messalina
 Christopher Biggins as Nero
 Ian Ogilvy as Nero Claudius Drusus
 David Robb as Germanicus
 Gary Lock as Young Germanicus
 John Castle as Postumus
 Alister Kerr as Young Postumus
 Fiona Walker as Agrippina
 Diana Hutchinson as Young Agrippina
 Frances White as Julia
 James Faulkner as Herod Agrippa
 Michael Clements as Young Herod
 Kevin McNally as Castor
 John Rhys-Davies as Naevius Sutorius Macro
 Christopher Guard as Marcus Claudius Marcellus
 Stratford Johns as Gnaeus Calpurnius Piso
 Bernard Hepton as Marcus Antonius Pallas
 John Cater as Tiberius Claudius Narcissus
 Barbara Young as Agrippinilla
 Beth Morris as Drusilla
 Simon MacCorkindale as Lucius Caesar
 Russell Lewis as Young Lucius
 Sheila Ruskin as Vipsania Agrippina
 Angela Morant as Octavia the Younger
 Graham Seed as Britannicus
 Jo Rowbottom as Calpurnia
 Lyndon Brook as Appius Junius Silanus
 Sam Dastor as Cassius Chaerea
 Kevin Stoney as Thrasyllus of Mendes
 Freda Dowie as Milonia Caesonia & Sibyl
 Irene Hamilton as Munatia Plancina
 Darien Angadi as Gaius Plautius Silanus
 Peter Bowles as Caratacus
 Norman Eshley as Marcus Vinicius
 John Bennett as Gaius Stertinius Xenophon
 Patsy Byrne as Martina
 Douglas Melbourne as Tiberius Gemellus
 Karin Foley as Helen
 Earl Rhodes as Gaius Caesar
 Richard Hunter as Drusus Caesar
 Cheryl Johnson as Claudia Octavia
 Isabel Dean as Lollia
 Liane Aukin as Aelia Paetina
 Moira Redmond as Domitia Lepida the Younger
 Bernard Hill as Gratus
 Norman Rossington as Sergeant of the Guard
 Lockwood West as Senator
 Nicholas Amer as Mnester
 Renu Setna as Antonius Musa
 Jennifer Croxton as Plautia Urgulanilla
 Charles Kay as Gaius Asinius Gallus
 Donald Eccles as Gaius Asinius Pollio
 Denis Carey as Livy
 John Truscott as Librarian
 Norman Shelley as Horace
 Carleton Hobbs as  Aristarchus
 Guy Siner as Pylades
 Edward Jewesbury as Titus
 Aubrey Richards as Lucius Visellius Varo
 Roy Purcell as Publius Vitellius the Younger
 Jonathan Burn as Paullus Fabius Maximus
 Esmond Knight as Domitus
 Jon Laurimore as Gnaeus Cornelius Lentulus Gaetulicus
 Bruce Purchase as  Gaius Sabinus
 James Fagan as Asprenas and Julia's lover
 Geoffrey Hinsliff as Rufrius
 George Little as Tortius
 Neal Arden as Cestius
 Sally Bazely as Poppea
 Jan Carey as Diana
 Peter Williams as  Gaius Silius Caecina
 Anne Dyson as Briseis
 George Pravda as Gershom
 Stuart Wilson as Gaius Silius
 Charlotte Howard as Scylla
 Manning Wilson as Gaius Vibius Marsus
 George Innes as Quintus Justus
 Linal Haft as Lucius Lusius Geta
 Kate Lansbury as Apicata
 Roger Bisley as Aulus Plautius and Senator
 Tony Haygarth as Claudius' Slave
 George Howe as Senator
 Pat Gorman as Captain of the Guard
 Neil Dickson as Guard
 Nick Willatt as Courier

Production

The series was produced by Joan Sullivan and Martin Lisemore, and directed by Herbert Wise. Production was delayed because of complex negotiations between the BBC and the copyright holders of Alexander Korda's aborted 1937 film version. This did, however, give the scriptwriter Jack Pulman more time to fine-tune his script.

The series was shot on videotape in the studios at BBC Television Centre, for artistic rather than budgetary reasons. I, Claudius was made at a relatively low cost of £60,000 for an hour of broadcast material (£ in ), in a series that had a total running time of 650 minutes.

As alluded to in the 2002 documentary I, Claudius: A Television Epic, the original version of episode 8, "Zeus, by Jove!", included a closing shot after Caligula has cut the fetus from Drusilla's womb, which was considered very shocking. It was therefore re-edited several times, even on the day of its premiere, by order of Bill Slater, then head of Serials Department. After initial broadcast and a rerun two days later, the scene was edited again, so that the episode is now "somewhat attenuated". The "slightly nastier version" of the episode's closing (a scene that used "makeup on her belly") was allegedly shown twice in 1976, but is now lost since the BBC no longer has a copy of it. Pulman noted that the original script for the episode ended with "a long shot showing the butchered woman hanging on a chariot".

The 2002 documentary, which features extensive interviews with all the principal cast members, revealed many previously unknown facts about the casting and development of the series, among them being:
 Derek Jacobi was well down the list of those considered to play Claudius. Among those considered for or offered the part before him were American film star Charlton Heston and British actor-comedian Ronnie Barker. Jacobi explained that he secured the role only after another prominent (unnamed) British actor who had taken the part proved to be unsuitable, and had to be replaced at short notice.
 Brian Blessed originally auditioned for the role of Tiberius, but was eventually persuaded to play Augustus instead. He recounted some of director Herbert Wise's key pieces of advice on how to play Augustus: Wise told Blessed that he should "be as you are – full of flannel", and that he should always play Augustus as an ordinary person, because the reactions of those around him would make him the Emperor.
 John Hurt said that he declined the role of Caligula when it was first offered to him. Because of the time-span of the production, the fact that Derek Jacobi would be the only actor to appear in every episode, and the subsequent commitments of the other actors, it was decided that rather than the customary "wrap party" at the end of the series, there would be a special pre-production party instead, to give the entire cast and crew the chance to meet. Hurt explained that series director Herbert Wise deliberately invited him to attend the party, hoping he would reconsider, and that he was so impressed on meeting the cast and crew that he immediately reversed his decision and took the part.
 Siân Phillips has spoken about her initial struggle to perform the character of Livia, because she focused more on making the character sympathetic and justifying her motives rather than playing her as straightforwardly evil. "I wasn't achieving anything much... I knew it, and they knew it. They would stand there and look faintly worried." Eventually Herbert Wise told her not to be afraid of playing her camp, saying to "Just be evil. The more evil you are, the funnier it is, and the more terrifying it is."

Music
Wilfred Josephs wrote the title music. David Wulstan and the Clerkes of Oxenford ensemble provided the (diegetic) music for most episodes.

Home media

Most VHS and DVD versions of the TV series include the BBC documentary The Epic That Never Was (1965), about the uncompleted Korda film version of the first book, featuring interviews with key production staff and actors as well as most of the surviving footage. The 2002 UK DVD edition also contains a documentary on the series, I, Claudius – a Television Epic, as well as some alternative and deleted scenes. The US DVD release was updated on 2 December 2008 with superior audio and video to the 2000 US DVD version, but it was met with hostile reviews from some customers, citing that some parts were either cut or censored from the original version, and no subtitles or closed captioning was included.

A 35th anniversary edition was released on 27 March 2012. It includes all 13 episodes (uncut except for the lost footage in "Zeus, by Jove!") on four discs, with SDH subtitles and one disc of bonus features.

Awards and reception

United Kingdom 
The initial reception of the show in the UK was negative, with The Guardian commenting sarcastically in its first review that "there should be a society for the prevention of cruelty to actors." However, the series went on to become a huge success with audiences. During its original airing in 1976, the BBC estimated that I, Claudius had an average audience of 2.5 million viewers per episode, based on rating surveys. Among other awards, the series won three BAFTAs in 1977 : Derek Jacobi, Best Actor (TV); Siân Phillips, Best Actress (TV); Tim Harvey, Best Design (TV). Director Herbert Wise won Outstanding Contribution Award at BAFTAs in 1978. In a list of the 100 Greatest British Television Programmes drawn up by the British Film Institute in 2000, voted for by industry professionals, I, Claudius placed 12th.

United States 
The series was subsequently broadcast in the United States as part of PBS's Masterpiece Theatre series, where it received critical acclaim. Tim Harvey won a 1978 Emmy for Outstanding Art Direction. The producers and director received Emmy nominations.

Legacy
I, Claudius is frequently cited as one of the best British television shows and one of the best shows in history. In 2007, it was listed as one of Time magazine's "100 Best TV Shows of All-TIME", and placed at #9 on BBC America's poll of the 10 best British dramas of all time. In 2016, it was ranked #8 out of 11 on The Daily Telegraphs list of groundbreaking British TV moments.

Contemporary critics are unanimous in their praise for the quality of the screenplay and the actors' performances, particularly those of Siân Phillips and Derek Jacobi. The Daily Telegraph opined that the "...lust for power, devious plotting and mesmerising machinations" displayed in the show foreshadowed later series like The Sopranos, Game of Thrones, and House of Cards. The creators of the hit 1980s soap opera, Dynasty, acknowledged that they were seeking to make a modern-day version of I, Claudius. Jace Lacob of The Daily Beast compared the character of Livia Soprano to the character of the same name in I, Claudius, saying that "... there is a whiff of familiarity about his Livia, as though the ghost of Phillips’ ancient Roman empress had echoed through millennia to rain chaos upon yet another dynastic clan."

In 2012, Mary McNamara of the Los Angeles Times credited I, Claudius with transforming the quality of television drama:
With its complex characters and multi-toned narrative, not to mention the high quality of writing, performance and direction, I, Claudius established a timeline that would eventually include the rise of HBO and all its cable competitors. This in turn expanded the palette and quality of network drama and, most recently, persuaded AMC executives to begin original programming.
However, criticism is sometimes leveled at the series over its outdated appearance and relatively poor production quality compared to modern TV drama, with Charlotte Higgins of The Guardian writing that "it's hard to suppress a giggle in the opening scene at Derek Jacobi's make-up and stringy wig."

See also
 Claudius
 Julio-Claudian dynasty

Notes

References

External links

 
 
 I, Claudius Project (concentrates on the BBC production)
 Encyclopedia of Television 
 British Film Institute Screen Online (TV series)

1976 British television series debuts
1976 British television series endings
1970s British drama television series
Depictions of Augustus on television
Depictions of Caligula on television
Depictions of Nero on television
Cultural depictions of Claudius
Cultural depictions of Messalina
Cultural depictions of Poppaea Sabina
Cultural depictions of Tiberius
Cultural depictions of Agrippina the Elder
Cultural depictions of Agrippina the Younger
Cultural depictions of Julia Drusilla
Cultural depictions of Germanicus
Cultural depictions of Claudia Octavia
1970s British television miniseries
BBC television dramas
British historical television series
I, Claudius
Secret histories
Television dramas set in ancient Rome
Television shows based on British novels
English-language television shows
Mariticide in fiction
Television series set in the Roman Empire
Television series set in the 1st century BC
Television series set in the 1st century